Rustam Saidov (Рустам Саидов; born 6 February 1978) is a boxer from Uzbekistan, who competed in the Super Heavyweight (+91 kg) at the 2000 Summer Olympics and won the bronze medal.

Career
In Athens at the 2004 Summer Olympics, he was eliminated in the first round of the Super Heavyweight (over 91 kg) division by Cuba's southpaw Michel Lopez Nuñez (13-18). He qualified for the Athens Games by winning the gold medal at the 2004 Asian Amateur Boxing Championships in Puerto Princesa, Philippines. In the final he defeated Tajikistan's Sergei Kharitonov.

In 2002 and 2006 he became Asian champ beating Olympic silver medallist Mukhtarkhan Dildabekov in the final both times.

2005 he lost to Russian southpaw Roman Romanchuk at the World Championships.

2007 he again made an early exit from the World Championships.

Olympic results 
2000
Defeated Ahmed Abdel Samad (Egypt) 21-8
Defeated Art Binkowski (Canada) RSC 2
Lost to Mukhtarkhan Dildabekov (Kazakhstan) 22-28

2004
Lost to Michel López Núñez (Cuba) 13-18

References
 
 

1978 births
Living people
Sportspeople from Tashkent
Uzbekistani male boxers
Olympic boxers of Uzbekistan
Olympic bronze medalists for Uzbekistan
Olympic medalists in boxing
Boxers at the 2000 Summer Olympics
Boxers at the 2004 Summer Olympics
Medalists at the 2000 Summer Olympics
Asian Games medalists in boxing
Asian Games gold medalists for Uzbekistan
Boxers at the 2002 Asian Games
Boxers at the 2006 Asian Games
Medalists at the 2002 Asian Games
Medalists at the 2006 Asian Games
AIBA World Boxing Championships medalists
Super-heavyweight boxers
21st-century Uzbekistani people